The Hamilton-Donald House is a historic house in Grand Island, Nebraska. It was built in 1905 for Ellsworth D. Hamilton by Henry Falldorf. In 1908, it was acquired by John Donald, a co-founder of the Donald Company, a dry goods and grocer's store. (Donald later purchased the Glade-Donald House, another historic house.) The house was designed in the Classical Revival architectural style. It has been listed on the National Register of Historic Places since March 13, 1986.

References

		
National Register of Historic Places in Hall County, Nebraska
Neoclassical architecture in Nebraska
Houses completed in 1905
1905 establishments in Nebraska